Richard Gentry (August 25, 1788 – December 25, 1837) was an American politician and military officer who died during the Seminole Wars. The Missouri county of Gentry is named for him. He was the first mayor and founder of Columbia, Missouri.

Early life
Richard Gentry was born August 25, 1788 in Madison County, Kentucky (then part of Virginia) to parents Richard and Jane (Harris) Gentry. His father was a veteran of the American Revolution and had been present at the surrender of Lord Cornwallis and his forces at the Battle of Yorktown. Young Richard grew up a child of the frontier, skilled in hunting and tracking, skills that would well serve him later in life. At age 19, Richard Gentry was commissioned a Lieutenant in the 19th Regiment of the Kentucky Militia and quickly promoted to Captain just three years later in 1811. On February 13, 1810 Gentry married Ann Hawkins, also of Madison County. They would eventually have four children.

War, new frontier, and politics
Gentry served under General (and future U.S. president) William Henry Harrison in the Great Lakes region during the War of 1812. At
the Battle of the Thames, Gentry and his soldiers charged through the British line and attacked the enemy from the rear resulting in their surrender. In 1816 Gentry and his young family left Kentucky for the new Missouri Territory, first settling in St. Louis County for a brief time before moving on upriver to the area around Franklin. In 1820 Gentry was one of the founders of Smithton, the village that would become Columbia, Missouri, and built the first home there for his family. Gentry defeated William Jewell to be elected Columbia's first Mayor. Richard Gentry was appointed a Colonel in the new Missouri Militia in 1822, and four years later in 1826 elected to a term in the Missouri Senate. President Andrew Jackson appointed Gentry as Postmaster for Columbia, Missouri in 1830, a post he held until his death. In 1832 during the Blackhawk War Gentry was given a commission of Major General and sent with a force of soldiers into northern Missouri to prevent a threatened raid by the Sauk and Fox tribes under Chief Blackhawk.

Final battle and death
President Martin Van Buren asked Missouri for volunteers in 1837 to help quell rebellious Seminole and other southern U.S. tribes. Richard Gentry was authorized to raise 600 men for service and on October 15, 1837, rode out of Columbia with his family physician and friend Dr. William Duncan who made a prophetic observation, "I fear this is our last meeting Richard ....If you are in battle you will be killed." For the second time in his life Gentry would be entering combat under the command of a future U.S. president, this time Zachary Taylor. Weeks later in early January 1838, the news arrived from Florida that Gentry, age 49, had died of wounds received at the Battle of Lake Okeechobee on Christmas Day, 1837. Several years later Gentry's body would be brought back to Missouri and reburied in Jefferson Barracks National Cemetery near St. Louis, Missouri. Gentry's grandson North Todd Gentry would go on to be Missouri Attorney General.

Further reading
Hunt, Doug. "Reckless: The Life and Death of Richard Gentry". 2010

References

External links
 

United States Army officers
American people of English descent
People from Madison County, Kentucky
Mayors of Columbia, Missouri
American city founders
Gentry family
1788 births
1837 deaths